Soul Duo is an album by American jazz organist Shirley Scott and flugelhornist Clark Terry recorded in 1966 for the Impulse! label.

Reception
The Allmusic review by Scott Yanow awarded the album 4 stars stating "This is one of organist Shirley Scott's lesser-known Impulse LPs ... Although not playing with the force that Stanley Turrentine exhibited when jamming with the organist, Clark Terry adds humor and a wistfulness to the date that easily compensates".

Track listing
All compositions by Shirley Scott except as indicated
 "Soul Duo" - 5:45
 "Until I Met You (Corner Pocket)" (Freddie Green, Don Wolf) - 5:40
 "This Light of Mine" - 3:30
 "Joonji" (Clark Terry) - 3:51
 "Clark Bars" (Terry) - 4:10
 "Taj Mahal" - 4:00
 "Up a Hair" - 4:59
 "Heat Wave" (Irving Berlin) - 4:27
Recorded at Olmstead Studio in New York City on August 19, 1966 (tracks 2, 3, 5 & 8) and August 22, 1966 (tracks 1, 4, 6 & 7)

Personnel
Shirley Scott — organ
Clark Terry - flugelhorn (tracks 1-6 & 8)
Bob Cranshaw (tracks 1, 4, 6 & 7), George Duvivier (tracks 2, 3, 5 & 8) - bass
Mickey Roker - drums

References

Impulse! Records albums
Shirley Scott albums
Clark Terry albums
1966 albums
Albums produced by Bob Thiele